Leopoldo A. Pando Zayas is a physicist and string theorist.  He is Professor in the Department of Physics at the University of Michigan, Ann Arbor.

Education and Career 

Leopoldo Avelino Pando Zayas grew up in Cuba.  In 1989, when he was a high school student, he won the Silver Medal in the International Physics Olympiad, which took place that year in Warsaw, Poland.

Pando Zayas received his M.S. degree in Physics in 1995, and his PhD in 1998, both from Moscow State University in Russia.  He has held visiting appointments at the Institute for Advanced Study in Princeton, New Jersey; the Kavli Institute for Theoretical Physics at the University of California, Santa Barbara; and, as a staff associate, at the Abdus Salam International Center for Theoretical Physics (ICTP) in Trieste, Italy.

Research and Publications 

Pando Zayas specializes in string theory with a focus on quantum gravity.   He has published many articles on the gauge/gravity correspondence and has applied these techniques to the study of the dynamics of superconductors and strongly interacting fluids.  His work has also elucidated the microscopic origin of the thermodynamics of black holes.

Pando Zayas translated a two-volume textbook on applications and methods in modern geometry, by B.A. Dubrovin, A.T. Fomenko, and S.P. Nóvikov, from Russian into Spanish.  This book appeared as Geometría moderna: métodos y aplicationes (Moscow, 2000).

References 

Living people
Year of birth missing (living people)
Theoretical physicists
String theorists
University of Michigan faculty
Moscow State University alumni
Cuban people of African descent
Cuban scientists